Ronan Carter (born 6 June 1996) is an English teen actor best known for his role of Christopher "Kit" Karter in the BAFTA-nominated British children's television comedy-drama Sadie J. Other notable screen credits include the main character in the short Mam as Danny, a twelve-year-old child, who must fend for his brothers and sisters - whilst trying to protect a secret that threatens to break up the family forever.

Filmography

References

External links

 

American male television actors
American male film actors
American male child actors
1996 births
Living people